Wald Rabi' District  is a district of the Al Bayda Governorate, Yemen. As of 2003, the district had a population of 19,427 inhabitants.   
  
It is the only district in the Al Bayda Governorate which is not contiguous.

References

Districts of Al Bayda Governorate
Wald Rabi' District